Joseph Welland (6 May 1798 – 6 March 1860) was born in Middleton, County Cork and became an Irish Architect for the Board of First Fruits and later the Ecclesiastical Commissioners. He was as a student to John Bowden and became his assistant and is noted to have designed many churches and schools around Ireland.

While working with John Bowden with the Board of First Fruits, he shared some of Bowden's works. These include St. Philip and St. James Church, Booterstown and St. Stephen's Church, Mount Street (The Pepper Canister), both of which Joseph Welland had to complete himself after Bowden's death in 1821.

Joseph Welland died on 6 March 1860 and was buried in St George's churchyard, Dublin.

His younger son William Joseph Welland (1832-1895) also designed churches, and worked for the Ecclesiastical Commissioners.

Selection of Works
St. Philip and St. James Church, Booterstown (1821)
St. Stephen's Church, Mount Street (The Pepper Canister) (1821)
North Strand Church (1836)
St. James' Church, James Street (1859)
St Mary’s Church, Nenagh (1862)
St Peter's Church, Ballymodan (1847)

References

Irish architects
Irish ecclesiastical architects
1798 births
1860 deaths
Architects of cathedrals
Burials at St. George's Church Cemetery, Dublin